The City of York is a local government district in North Yorkshire, England.

City of York may also refer to:
York, the principal settlement in the City of York in North Yorkshire, England
City of York (UK Parliament constituency), a former constituency represented in the British House of Commons
York, Toronto, a former city within the current city of Toronto, Ontario, Canada; currently a district of Toronto
List of ships named City of York
The City in Pennsylvania (York, Pennsylvania)

See also
York (disambiguation)